The videography of Korean-American singer Jay Park consists of fifteen music videos, six Jay Park TV webisodes, two films and several appearances on television programs, including Immortal Songs 2 and Saturday Night Live Korea.

Music videos

Official music videos

Other music video appearances

Performances

Music Shows

Immortal Songs 2

YouTube

Park first created his own YouTube channel on March 15, 2010, called "jayparkaom", posting his cover of "Nothin' on You" with his own rap and lyrics. The video went viral and garnered two million views in less than one day. Park continued to use YouTube to reach out to his fans, and uploaded more videos where he covered a variety of songs and played around with his friends from Art of Movement (AOM). Park describes himself as a "huge YouTube freak", and that he enjoys watching covers, comedy, battles, singing, dancing, and his friends Ryan Higa, Kevjumba, and Traphik.

Park also collaborated with other rappers and singers famous for their YouTube following, such as Dumbfoundead and Clara Chung on the track "Clouds". Shortly after Park performed at ISA 2010 in Los Angeles alongside many YouTube celebrities, Park featured in a highly anticipated short skit with Ryan Higa and Phil Wang, titled "Word of the Day - Bromance", which quickly went viral and has reached nearly thirteen million views as of December 2012. Park continued to collaborate and perform with fellow YouTuber's, most notably at ISA LA concert in 2010 and 2011.

Before the release of his EP, Take A Deeper Look, Park's original YouTube channel was unexpectedly removed. Park quickly created a new channel, "jaybumaom0425", reassuring fans not to worry. Park manages his own YouTube channel and uploads all the content himself; a situation which is unheard of in the K-pop industry. Park has stated that he likes to upload content that comes straight from him, and how he reads the comments and replies he gets from fans. Park also continues to upload songs and raps, b-boy and dance practice, acrobatics, choreography, news and updates for his fans, and other humorous clips.

While Park was in Los Angeles as a part of his 2012 APAHM tour, Park collaborated with AJ Rafael on a live remix of "Here All Alone, Pt. 3", an original song by AJ Rafael, and was filmed and uploaded by Knocksteady on June 4, 2012. Park also collaborated on a dance video of Love Faces by Trey Songz, co-starring and choreographed by Di "Moon" Zhang from I.aM.mE dance crew, champions of the sixth season of America's Best Dance Crew. While in Malaysia in May, Park collaborated with Dennis Yin of Elecoldxhot on a choreographed dance video of "Tonight" by John Legend.

On June 27, 2012, Park featured in YOMYOMF Network's comedy webseries with Kevjumba, in a video titled "KevJumba Takes on Zombies w/ Jay Park", where Kevjumba and Park go head-to-head in a series of paintball challenges against zombies and each other. On October 29, Park was featured in a YouTube skit by David So, titled "The Last Resort", along with Dumbfoundead. The skit is a parody of Wong Fu Productions's viral short film, "The Last". Park plays an emotional, but comedic, ex-boyfriend of the female lead, Julie Zhan. His scene was filmed at the last-minute due to a flying visit to Los Angeles.

Jay Park TV

In July 2012, Park began to release regular webisodes of Jay Park TV through his YouTube channel, filmed and edited by Hep, Park's friend and fellow Art of Movement member. The web series shows Park's daily life with his friends, behind-the-scenes of concerts and filming, and the fun and games that he gets up to. Each episode starts with a series of comedic photos of Park or his friends, along with a logo and introduction music made by Cha Cha, a producer and member of AOM. Park has been credited by viewers for being down-to-earth and natural, and also including Korean subtitles for his fans in Korea, as the main language spoken in the episodes is English.

The 1st episode, released on July 23, 2012, shows Park hanging out with his friends from AOM while in Korea. Park also included his personal footage recorded on his iPhone, which shows Park on stage at "Highlight Festival 2012" concert with Far East Movement. Park also showed his comedic nature while posing for photos outside a giant poster of his face at a Googims store. The episode also shows Park behind-the-scenes of filming a TV advert for Williamsburg, and the long hours involved.  At the end of the episode, Park is shown with Dok2, The Quiett, KrNfx, AOM, and Park's b-boy friends at R-16 Korea before their performances on stage. Finally, Park sings in an impromptu performance of Billie Jean by Michael Jackson on the streets at night, outside a restaurant, beatboxed by KrNfx.

In the 2nd episode, released two weeks after the first on August 5, 2012, starts by showing Park, his friends, and his dancers, on the way to Malaysia for MTV World Stage Live in Malaysia 2012. Park also included footage of his stage rehearsal for the concert, and him jokingly posing behind Kara when they were being interviewed.  Park included a clip of audio problems he was having while performing at the W Hotel in Seoul, which he countered by finishing his song "Girlfriend" by singing a capella. Later, Park is shown joking around with his friends, and goes on to explain to the camera how tired he is due to lack of sleep, but has to go on to b-boy battle at R-16 Korea the same day.  At the end of the episode, Park is seen mimicking Internet celebrity Antoine Dodson's Bed Intruder Song by The Gregory Brothers, while wearing a makeshift bandana.

The 3rd episode, released August 26, 2012, is narrated throughout by Park. The episode starts with the members of Art of Movement travelling by car in the early hours of the morning, with Park passed out, much to the amusement of his friends, who take the opportunity to make sexually-suggestive jokes using Park's unconscious body.  The episode goes on to show dance and stage rehearsals for Park's "New Breed Asia Tour in Seoul" concert along with Park's friends from the Prepix dance crew. Park also introduces Ailee, who came to watch the concert, backstage in the dressing room before the start of the concert. The episode goes on to show Park performing at a club, hanging out and playing games with his friends and fellow b-boys.

After a 3-month hiatus, the 4th episode was released on December 3, 2012. Park gives viewers an update of the last few months, mentioning his concerts in Australia, time spent at home in Seattle, b-boy battles he attended, and gives shout-outs to Ben Baller and Steven Jo. Park goes on to show behind the scenes clips of his time filming Saturday Night Live Korea skits and a parody music video.  Park becomes the cameraman for part of this episode as he films Hep, member of Art of Movement and his videographer, teasing his clothing and making reference to "Low" by Flo Rida, and locking him in a cupboard.  The episode goes on to show Park rapping and singing during recording sessions, and practising b-boying, flipping, and tumbling. Park also continues the tradition of introducing video footage from his iPhone, including an appearance by Kyuhyun from Super Junior who lip-syncs to Park's song "Abandoned".

On March 25, 2013, Park released the 5th episode, starting in Singapore where Park had a showcase in January, 2013. Park takes fans behind the scenes during press conferences, interviews, and the concert. Park's brother, Jehan, and members of dance team, Prepix, are featured heavily in this episode. Park is seen dancing and joking with his friends before his Singapore showcase. Footage of Park performing is also included, as well a Park opening and drinking a bottle of champagne given to him by fans after the show. Next in the episode, Park is at a photoshoot for Men's Health Korea Magazine, where Park is mostly shirtless, to the delight of fans. Park also makes reference to Justin Timberlake's 2013 single, "Suit & Tie", as Park is dressed in a suit and tie for the next park of the photoshoot. The next scene is at the "Illionaire 2nd Anniversary Concert", where Park is performing with friends Dok2, The Quiett, and Beenzino. Park also shows behind-the-scenes footage of filming the music video for this free 2013 song, "Appetizer".

On June 18, 2013, the 6th episode of Jay Park TV was released.

On July 30, 2013, the 7th and final episode of Jay Park TV was released.

Filmography

Film

Television

{| class="wikitable"
!Year
!Title
! width="500"|Notes
|-
|2007
|Mnet Hot Blood Men
|Pre-debut days.
|-
|rowspan="2"|2008
|MBC Idol Show
|Season 3 featuring 2PM.
|-
|SBS Star King
|Regular cast member.
|-
|rowspan="6"|2009
|KBS2 Sang Sang Plus
|Featuring GOD & 2PM's Jaebeom, Nichkhun & Taecyeon.
|-
|MBC Introducing a Star's Friend
|Regular cast member.
|-
|KBS2 I Have An Uncle
|Aired on September 8, September 15, and September 22, Episode 16 - 18 featuring 2PM Jaebeom & Chansung.
|-
|Mnet Wild Bunny
|Seven episodes featuring 2PM, with the eighth episode unaired.
|-
|MBC Nodaji
|Regular cast member and host.
|-
|KBS Star Golden Bell
|Episode: 234, 239 (Aired on June 6), 243
|-
|rowspan="12"|2011
|tvN Dream Special
|Aired on February 29 and February 26.
|-
|KBS Guerilla Date
|Aired on March 3 in lead up to Take A Deeper Look mini-album release.
|-
|Y-Star News
|Interview with Park, and behind the scenes of filming for his music video for "Tonight", on March 19.
|-
|MBC Dramatic
|First episode aired on April 26.
|-
|KBS Lee So-ra's Second Proposal
|Aired on May 18, with Park performing the full version of his 6 Foot 7 Foot remix live for the first time.
|-
|rowspan="1"|KBS Immortal Songs 2
|Was a regular cast member from August 6 to September 10 and rejoined for a single special episode on November 19 titled "King of Kings".
|-
|rowspan="2"|KBS Guerilla Date
|Joining fellow cast members of movie, Mr. Idol.
|-
|Aired on August 13 with fellow Immortal Songs 2 cast members Huh Gak and Hyorin.
|-
|KBS Hello Baby
|Episode for September 9 of SISTAR's and Leeteuk's Hello Baby, where Park makes cameo appearances backstage at Immortal Songs 2 filming.
|-
|KBS Happy Together
|Aired on October 13 alongside fellow Mr. Idol cast members.
|-
|tvN Taxi
|Aired on November 11, filmed before the 2011 Style Icon Awards, where Park was performing.
|-
|KBS Hello
|Aired on November 28.
|-
|rowspan="19"|2012
|KBS Gag Concert
|Played a cameo role as a dancing ninja on February 2.
|-
|Y-Star Bus Star
|Aired on February 24.
|-
|rowspan="1"|KBS Immortal Songs 2
|Rejoined as a regular cast member from February 25 to April 14. Returned for a special episode which aired October 27.
|-
|KBS Hello
|Aired on February 27.
|-
|MBC Weekly Idol
|Aired on March 3.
|-
|KBS Guerilla Date
|Aired on March 10.
|-
|JTBC Made in U
|Park appears as a cameo, as the best couple from reality show, Made in U, are taken backstage at Park's "New Breed Live in Seoul" concert on the episode for March 10.
|-
|Mnet Yoon Do Hyun's MUST
|Park appears as a guest for the episode for March 18. Park also performs songs from his New Breed album, covers Usher's "U Got It Bad", and performs with his b-boy crew, Art of Movement (AOM).
|-
|MBC Vampire Idol
|Played the role of "J", a vampire from America in search of the sweetest human blood, for Episode 77, which aired on March 28.
|-
|KBS Lee So-ra's Second Proposal
|Aired on March 28 featuring an interview with Park, and performances of "Girlfriend" and "Know Your Name".
|-
|Mnet The Beatle Code 2
|Aired March 29, alongside Nine Muses and Park Eunji.
|-
|SBS You & I
|A talk show hosted by Lee Hyori and Jung Jae-hyung where Park also performed songs from his New Breed album. Aired on April 1.
|-
|MBC Music & Lyrics
|Episode 3, which aired in four parts from April 14 to May 5, with actress Lee Si-young, where they were tasked to create a song for upcoming girl group, Tiny-G.
|-
|MBC Music Show Champion
|Park was interviewed on the show with Lee Si-young as a part of Music & Lyrics filming, watching Tiny-G perform "Polaris".
|-
|KBS Dream Team 2
|Park was a part of the "Asia Stars" team. Aired on May 6.
|-
|MBC Come To Play|A fixed panel member on the "True Man Show", along with Yoo Jae-suk, Eun Ji-won, Kwon Oh-joong, Kim Won-hee, and Kim Eung-soo. Aired on a weekly schedule from September 10 to December 24.
|-
|tvN Saturday Night Live Korea|Hosted the December 1 broadcast, featuring in many skits and in a special parody music video of "Love The Way You Lie" titled "Because I'm a Man".
|-
|JTBC Patti Kim Show|A tribute show to famous pop singer Patti Kim, aired December 23.
|-
|MBC Music Haha's 19TV Mutiny|Hosted by singer and entertainer Haha, aired December 24.
|-
| rowspan="6" |2013
|tvN Saturday Night Live Korea|Rejoined SNL as a fixed cast member of season 4 which started airing weekly on February 23.
|-
|tvN Taxi|Aired on April 8. Park featured alongside fellow Saturday Night Live Korea cast member Kim Seul-gi.
|-
||Mnet Wide Open Studio
|Park and Seo In-guk featured on the show before their respective comebacks on M! Countdown on April 11.
|-
|KBS Dream Team 2|Aired on May 19. Park was on the show alongside idol groups Secret and Rainbow.
|-
||MBC Radio Star|Aired on July 19.
|-
|SBS Hwasin: Controller of the Heart
|Aired on April 16. Appeared as a guest alongside Kim Young-ok, Kim Soo-mi, JK Kim Dong-wook, Im Si-wan, Choi Pil-lip
|-
| rowspan="2" |2014
|tvN Saturday Night Live Korea
|Appeared as a fixed cast member of season 5
|-
|Mnet 4 Things Show:Season 1
|An 18 episode documentary that showcased a star from four different perspectives through interviews with the star and 3 people around him. Park appeared on the 1st two episodes.
|-
| rowspan="4" |2015
|tvN Saturday Night Live Korea
|A fixed cast member of season 6
|-
|MBC King of Mask Singer
|Appeared as a contestant on Episode 41 & 42 as Cold City Monkey
|-
|Mnet Show Me the Money 4
|Appeared as a Judge/Producer along with fellow label member Loco as Team AOMG
|-
|iQiyi Ding Ge Lon Dong Qiang
|A variety show in which Chinese and foreign stars participate to combine opera culture and entertainment. Regular cast member with Jang Hyuk, Kim Jong-kook
|-
| rowspan="2" |2016
|SBS The Collaboration
|Appeared as a regular cast member
|-
|jTBC Let's Eat Dinner Together
|Appeared as a guest on Episode 96 with Simon Dominic
|-
| rowspan="2" |2017
|tvN Buzzer Beat
|Celebrity basketball players form teams and compete with each other led by former professional basketball players as their coaches. Was a regular cast member. Position Team H guard
|-
|Mnet Show Me the Money 6
|Appeared as a Judge/Producer along with Dok2
|-
|2018
|SBS Baek Jong-won's Alley Restaurant
|Made a special appearance as customers on Episode 75 along with Haon
|-
|2019
|MBN Sign Here
|A survival audition program between MBN in collaboration with AOMG to find the next artist to enter AOMG. Park appeared as a Judge along with fellow labelmates Simon Dominic, Gray, Code Kunst and Woo Won-jae
|-
|2019
|SBS Delicious Rendezvous
|Appeared in the Pilot Episode as well as Episodes 13–15, 28-29
|-
| rowspan="2" |2021
|SBS Delicious Rendezvous
|Appeared on Episode 63 & 64 with Lee Na-eun(April
|-
|Mnet High School Rapper (season 4)
|Appeared as a mentor along with fellow H1gher labelmates Woogie and pH-1
|-
|2023
|JTBC Peak Time
|Appeared as a judge
|-
|}

Radio

See also
 Jay Park discography
 Saturday Night Live Korea''
 Nigahiga
 Wong Fu Productions

References

External links
 

Videography
Videographies of South Korean artists